LeAir Charter Services Ltd. is a small regional airline based in Nassau, Bahamas, at Lynden Pindling International Airport (LPIA). The company was founded in 1996. 

The airline operates scheduled flights within the Bahamas (Nassau, Andros Town, Great Harbour Cay, Mangrove Cay) as well as charters in the Bahamas and the Caribbean.

Fleet
The LeAir fleet consists of the following aircraft:

External links 
 Official website
 Facebook

References 

Airlines of the Bahamas
Airlines established in 1996
1996 establishments in the Bahamas